Lazar Popović (born 10 January 1983) is a Serbian retired footballer who played as a striker.

Popović was a member of the Serbia and Montenegro youth teams.

Club career
Popović started his professional career in FK Čukarički and played for the club between 2000 and 2009, he also made a small appearance in Ligue 2 with Stade Brestois 29 in the 2005–06 season.

In March 2009 he made a move to South Korea and Daegu FC. However, he was released in June 2009 from the club after failing to score goals. In August the same year Popović signed a contract with the Bosnian side FK Željezničar Sarajevo. In May 2010 he won the Premijer Liga with Željezničar and was also a runner-up in the Cup of Bosnia and Herzegovina.

In December 2011, he signed with Malaysia Super League side Perak FA. Earlier reports from Malaysian media quoted Perak management have released Popović from his contract on 1 April 2012, however later reports stated that Perak management have retained his services until 16 April, the last day for registration window for import players. On 14 April 2012 he managed to score his only goal for Perak in his final game with the team, in a 3–1 win against Sabah FA. He ended his stint with Perak with only one goal in 16 appearances in all competitions (14 league matches and 2 cup matches).

After his release from Perak, he returned to Europe to join Albanian Superliga team FK Kukësi for the 2012–13 season. At Kukësi, Popović enjoyed some renaissance to his career, becoming his club top scorer in 2012–13 with 20 goals, including 16 goals in the league to make him second top scorer in the league and helping his club to 2nd position overall that season.

Later in his career, he played for KS Kastrioti and Kavala. He initially retired in 2015, but later played for Lokomotiva Beograd.

International career
Popović appeared for the Serbia and Montenegro U21 team during 2004–2005.

References

External links

Living people
1983 births
Association football forwards
Serbian footballers
FK Čukarički players
Stade Brestois 29 players
Ligue 2 players
Daegu FC players
Serbian expatriate sportspeople in South Korea
Serbian SuperLiga players
K League 1 players
FK Željezničar Sarajevo players
Perak F.C. players
Expatriate footballers in France
Expatriate footballers in South Korea
FK Kukësi players